Sir William Lowther (c. 1612 – February 1688) was an English landowner and politician who sat in the House of Commons from 1660 to 1679.

Life
Lowther was the son of Sir John Lowther of Lowther Hall and his wife Eleanor Fleming, daughter of Wiliam Fleming of Rydal.  In 1660, he was elected Member of Parliament for Pontefract in the Convention Parliament He was re-elected MP for Pontefract in 1661 for the Cavalier Parliament. He was knighted on 30 December 1661 and was dwelling at Swillington.

Family
Lowther married Jane Busfield  daughter of William Busfield, merchant of Leeds, Yorkshire, by 1636. They had five sons and nine daughters, including
Sir William Lowther (1639–1705)
Rev. Richard Lowther, married Margaret Adams and had issue
Jane Lowther (c. 1641 – 7 April 1713), married Sir Francis Bland, 2nd Baronet
Eleanor Lowther, married Richard Harrison of Cave
Mary Lowther, married William Ellis of Kidwell
Agnes Lowther, married William Dawson
Frances Lowther, married on 2 October 1676 Richard Beaumont (d. 1691)
Dorothy Lowther, married Robert Baynes of Knowerthorp
He was also the brother of Sir John Lowther, 1st Baronet.

References

1610s births
1688 deaths
17th-century English landowners
William
English MPs 1660
English MPs 1661–1679